Paul Pearsall (1942-2007) was an American neuropsychologist and author.

Education
Pearsall was a 1963 graduate of  the University of Michigan. His postgraduate degrees were earned at Wayne State University:  a master's degree in Educational and Clinical Psychology  in 1965, and PhD in Clinical and Educational Psychology in 1968. His postdoctoral work included studies  at United States Army War College, and the Arizona, Harvard and Albert Einstein Schools of Medicine.

Positive psychology 
Pearsall is known for his work on positive psychology and is often citing the role of emotions such as hope and love in surviving stress, depression, and psychological trauma. For instance, he introduced the notion of personal "strange attractors" drawn to each other to produce a bond that allows a couple to navigate life's obstacles. Several of his books explained how positive thinking, perseverance, and being authentic can be achieved by rearranging one's emotions and outlook, developing a heightened will in the process.

Pearsall is also known for counselling individuals who underwent heart transplantation and claimed that these patients experience significant and inexplicable changes in personality after the surgery in which they became more like their donors in temperament and personal preferences.

Published works
Super Joy, Doubleday Books, 
Awe: The Delights and Dangers of Our Eleventh Emotion 
Ten Laws of Lasting Love, Simon & Schuster,  
Sexual Healing: Using the Power of an Intimate, Loving Relationship to Heal Your Body and Soul, Crown Publishers  
Toxic Success: How to Stop Striving and Start Thriving, Inner Ocean Publishing,  
The Power of the Family, Doubleday Books, 
The Last Self-Help Book You'll Ever Need:  Repress Your Anger, Think Negatively, Be a Good Blamer, and Throttle Your Inner Child,  Basic, 
The Beethoven Factor: The New Positive Psychology of Hardiness, Happiness, Healing, and Hope, Hampton Roads Publishing Company, 2003 
The Heart's Code: Tapping the Wisdom and Power of Our Heart Energy,  Broadway Books,  1999, 
Super Immunity : Master Your Emotions and Improve Your Health 1988, 
Super Marital Sex, 1987, 
Making Miracles, Prentice Hall Press, 1991
  The Pleasure Prescription: To Love,To Work, to Play- Life in the Balance. 1996 Hunter House Publishing 
Write Your Own Pleasure Prescription: 60 Ways to Create Balance and Joy in Your Life, 1997″

Death
Pearsall died of a spontaneous haemorrhagic stroke on July 13, 2007.

References

External links
Goodreads.com
Heart Energy Amplitude Recognition Test

See also 
 List of psychologists
Cardiac psychology
Heart transplantation
Bruce Lipton

1942 births
2007 deaths
American male non-fiction writers
American psychology writers
American relationships and sexuality writers
American self-help writers
University of Michigan alumni
Wayne State University alumni
20th-century American male writers